Oskar Bäck (born March 12, 2000) is a Swedish professional ice hockey forward currently playing with the Texas Stars in the American Hockey League (AHL) as a prospect to the Dallas Stars of the National Hockey League (NHL). Bäck was drafted in the third round, 75th overall, by the Stars in the 2018 NHL Entry Draft.

Playing career
Bäck made his SHL debut playing for Färjestad BK in 2017, playing in 14 games in the 2017–18 season.

On 9 May 2018, Bäck was signed to continue his development with BIK Karlskoga of the HockeyAllsvenskan for the duration of the 2018–19 season. Receiving heavier minutes and responsibilities, Bäck registered 16 assists and 20 points in 45 regular season games. Following BIK Karlskoga's qualification series, Bäck returned to SHL club, Färjestad BK.

On 22 April 2021, Bäck was signed by draft club, the Dallas Stars, to a three-year, entry-level contract.

Career statistics

Regular season and playoffs

International

References

External links
 

2000 births
Living people
Bofors IK players
Dallas Stars draft picks
Färjestad BK players
Swedish ice hockey centres
Texas Stars players
Sportspeople from Karlstad